Teesri Manzil   (English: "Third Floor") is a 1966 Indian musical thriller film directed by Vijay Anand and produced by Nasir Hussain. It starred Shammi Kapoor and Asha Parekh, along with Laxmi Chhaya, Premnath, Prem Chopra, Iftekhar, Helen, K. N. Singh and Salim Khan. The film became a hit at the box office. With the music and songs setting records, this movie is considered among the best offerings and one of the first breakthroughs of R.D. Burman's career.

Indiatimes Movies ranks the movie amongst the Top 25 Must See Bollywood Films. notably for its extremely foot tapping music and songs, which remain very popular till date. The film is also noted for its memorable lead pair, superb mystery, tight script and above all, brilliant performance by Shammi Kapoor.

The film's DVD & VCD versions run for 145 minutes, while the theatre version ran for 175 minutes. Between Ruby's jealous sniping at minute 76 and the song "Dekhiye Sahiban Woh Koi Aur Thi", sung by Mohammed Rafi, approximately 30 minutes of footage is missing. The last time a full version of this film released was on VHS. Many people in China and Hawaii reviewed it five stars. Now uncut full movie is available on YouTube and if its OTT presentation is concerned, it is available in Zee5 since early 2020.

Plot

A young girl, Rupa (Sabina), mysteriously falls to her death from the third floor of The Park hotel in Mussoorie. Before her fall, she bangs on the door of a man named Rocky (Shammi Kapoor), pleading with him to let her in. Her death is assumed to be suicide by everyone at the hotel, including Rocky.

A year later, Rupa's sister Sunita (Asha Parekh) reveals to her friend Meena (Laxmi Chhaya), that Rupa had written to her, confessing that she was in love with a drummer named Rocky at The Park hotel, and implying that they had sexual relations, and she desperately needs him to marry her. Sunita, believes Rocky seduced and then jilted her sister, which led her to commit suicide. She intends to travel to Dehradun and Mussoorie, find Rocky and avenge her sister's death.

On her way to Dehradun, she meets Anil - a charming but mischievous man who flirts with her. As she checks into The Park hotel to find Rocky, she finds Anil there too, and he continues to woo her. Unbeknownst to her, Anil is Rocky. Anil finds out about Sunita's real intentions, and misleads her - making another coworker impersonate Rocky, while he continues to pursue her as Anil. He even lies about his job - telling her he is the nephew and heir of a wealthy landlord who resides in a local mansion in Dehradun. While initially Sunita rebukes him and rebuffs his advances, she eventually falls in love with him, even confiding in him about her sister's tragic death and her hatred for Rocky. Anil keeps up his charade and ends up having to entertain Sunita and her friends at his 'uncle's' mansion. His lie is almost caught when the real owner of the mansion Kunwarsahab (Prem Nath) shows up. However, Kunwarsahab plays along and covers for Anil. The two become good friends.

Sunita invites Anil and his 'uncle' to meet with her father so they can begin planning the wedding. Anil requests Kunwarsahab to explain the whole truth to Sunita and her father, however, Kunwarsahab instead keeps up the pretense and agrees on the alliance. With no other option, Anil writes a letter to Sunita explaining that he is Rocky, but he never seduced her sister, and had no idea she would kill herself over him. Sunita is aghast when she reads the letter and breaks up with him. As he tries to unsuccessfully pursue and convince her, he in intercepted by a police inspector who is investigating Rupa's murder. Anil tells the inspector that Rupa relentlessly pursued him last year, despite being engaged to another man, Ramesh (Prem Chopra). This made Ramesh furious and he threatened to kill Rupa in front of Anil. On the night she fell, Rupa had called Anil, telling him she desperately wants to meet with him, however Anil had refused and did not open the door when Rupa banged on it. A few minutes later, he heard her fall.

Anil suspects Ruby to be Rupa's murderer, as she had intercepted Rupa and Anil's call, and was always jealous of any other woman who came close to Anil. However, during a confrontation, Ruby is shot by an unknown assailant. The inspector takes Anil into custody, warning him that the shooter was aiming for Anil, not Ruby, because they believe Anil is getting close to discovering the real killer. He shows Anil an expensive coat button found in Rupa's hand which he believes she tore off of her killer's coat. Anil then suspects Ramesh, Rupa's rich fiance who had threatened to kill her. Ramesh denies the accusation, although he was present at the hotel on the night Rupa died, and is also seen secretly bribing someone dressed as Ruby's killer with a bottle of whisky. However, without any proof, he is let off.

As Anil returns to his hotel room, an unknown woman visits him, telling him to take her car and go to a restaurant at the bottom of the hill, where he will find the conspirators. Anil does so, but finds while driving that the car has been sabotaged. He leaps out as the car plummets down a cliff. Presumed dead by everyone, he secretly visits Sunita, convinced that Ramesh killed both Rupa and Ruby and is now trying to kill him. He enlists Sunita's help, who now believes his innocence and takes him to meet Ramesh at the Park Hotel. While there, Anil spots the same woman who set him up with the sabotaged car, and pursues her. He is surprised to see her drive into Kunwarsahab's mansion. Shocked at seeing him, Kunwarsahab insists that Anil is not safe anywhere and must stay with him. He forces Anil into an old room and instructs him to stay there till morning. As he begrudgingly goes through a closet, looking for clothes to change into, Anil comes across a coat with the exact same buttons that the inspector had shown him. The coat is missing a button.

Realizing that Kunwarsahab is the real killer, Anil forges an escape, just as Kunwarsahab and the unknown woman who is a widow with three children, his mistress, enter his room to kill him in his sleep. Anil gets a hold of the unknown woman  while Kunwarsahab leaves to look for him, and forces her to confess the real truth. The unknown woman (a widow with three children) divulges to the inspector that she and Kunwarsahab had an affair that his wife discovered, and tried to shoot him. Kunwarsahab tackled her, shooting her in the tussle. While they are burying her corpse, Rupa spots them as she is on her way to meet Rocky. She gives herself away and flees to the hotel, with Kunwarsahab in pursuit. She bangs on Rocky's door, but he does not open, unaware of her predicament. Kunwarsahab picks her up and throws her off the third floor.

Kunwarsahab enters at the very moment and shoots his mistress (the unknown woman) killing her. He then tries to kill Anil, however, goes over the ledge of his mansion in the struggle. Anil holds onto him, asking him to surrender himself to the police, who have arrived on the scene. However, Kunwarsahab prefers to die, and lets go of Anil's hand, falling to his death from the third floor of his mansion. The film ends with Anil and Sunita going back to Delhi on the same train where they met the first time.

Cast

Shammi Kapoor as Anil Kumar "Sona"/Rocky: Anil is a drummer who plays at the Park Hotel. He is the love interest of both Rupa, Sunita and Ruby, although he only has feelings for Sunita. He flirts and pursues Sunita, while lying about his true identity. He pretends to be the heir of a wealthy landlord to win Sunita's favour.  Though his methods are often questionable, his intentions are good.
Asha Parekh as Sunita: Sunita is Rupa's younger sister, who wants to avenge her sister's death. She comes from a wealthy family and is bold, independent and outspoken. While she initially rebuffs Anil, she eventually falls in love with him. She blames Rocky/Anil for her sister's death and breaks up with him when she learns the truth.
Prem Chopra as Ramesh: Ramesh is Rupa's fiance. He discovers Rupa's indiscretions and threatens to kill her. After Rupa's death, he wishes to marry Sunita. 
Sabina as Rupa: Rupa is Sunita's older sister and Ramesh' fiancee. However, she falls for Rocky and aggressively pursues him, despite his disinterest.
Helen as Ruby: Ruby is a dancer at the Park Hotel where Rocky is a drummer. She is in love with Rocky/Anil and is constantly trying to seduce him. She often tries to interfere in his romantic life, like listening to a private conversation between Rupa and Rocky.
Premnath as Kunwarsahab: Kunwarsahab is a wealthy landlord who pretends to be Anil's uncle to help him save face. He acts as his guardian and confidante.
Laxmi Chhaya as Meena: Meena is a friend and confidant of Sunita who is seemingly shy and reserved. 
Ram Avtar as train passenger
Iftekhar as Police Inspector
Raj Mehra as Sunita's Dad
Salim Khan as Rocky's Friend

Background
Nasir Hussain produced and wrote Teesri Manzil under his home banner. He approached Dev Anand to star in the film and he immediately agreed. However, at the same time, another of Nasir Hussain's productions, Baharon Ke Sapne, was to be directed by Vijay Anand. Then, on occasion of Sadhana's engagement party, a misunderstanding erupted between Dev Anand and Nasir Hussain, when Hussain allegedly overheard Dev Anand saying. "The film which Nasir is making with me is coloured and he has given Goldie some black-and-white film to make. Goldie is making the movie with some new boy, Rajesh Khanna". It was the next day that Hussain requested Vijay Anand to direct Teesri Manzil and offered to helm Baharon Ke Sapne, but specified that Teesri Manzil would not have Dev Anand in it. It was only then that Shammi Kapoor was approached.

Vijay Anand came on board to direct and edit the film. Hussain then cast Shammi Kapoor, who had earlier starred in Hussain's two big hits Tumsa Nahin Dekha (1957) and Dil Deke Dekho (1959), the latter of which introduced Asha Parekh. Asha had starred in two more hits for Hussain Jab Pyar Kisise Hota Hai (1961) and Phir Wohi Dil Laya Hoon (1963). Thus, the newcomer for this film would be music composer R.D. Burman (son of music composer S.D. Burman), and he would create phenomenal music for this film. He would compose for all of Hussain's films until Zabardast (1985). Shammi Kapoor, Hussain and Vijay individually took credit for discovering the supremely talented R.D. Burman, but R.D. Burman gave credit to lyricist Majrooh Sultanpuri for recommending him to Hussain, and both of them would create unforgettable songs for Teesri Manzil. All the hit songs featured Mohammed Rafi The song picturizations were outstanding, with Helen dancing to "Oh Haseena Zulfon Waali". Songs such as "Aaja aaja" had a rock n' roll base and were extremely popular.

The song 'Tumne mujhe dekha hokar meherbaan', has particular significance to Shammi Kapoor. It is said that some (indeterminate) time before the song was about to be shot, he received news that his wife at the time, Geeta Bali, had just died. Consummate professional that he was, he said he wanted to continue the filming due to the costs to the producer. And so the song was shot while he was in mourning. His tearing up and acting in the song is very real due to this background. There is a particular sequence in the song, where a three pronged candle stand on Asha Parekh's table falls over and the candles are blown off. Shammi Kapoor walks over to the table, picks a lit candle from the neighbouring table, and appears to light all three candles. But when he straightens the candle holder, and the camera turns from a side-on view, to a front-on view, you can see that the middle candle has been left unlit. It seems Shammi Kapoor told the director to leave the shot as-is, and that was his way of showing that the light in his life, his wife, had been taken away.

Soundtrack 
All the songs were composed by Rahul Dev Burman and lyrics were penned by Majrooh Sultanpuri. Mohammed Rafi featured in all the songs and Asha Bhosle sang all the female parts. Choreography was by Herman Benjamin.

Reception
The film became a hit and remains popular to this day. Although it is a murder mystery, it continues to draw repeat audiences, even though the identity of the murderer is no longer a secret. Teesri Manzil was the last time Shammi starred in a Nasir Hussain film. Asha would go on to do four more, three of which she starred in.

Hussain and Vijay never worked together after Teesri Manzil. Hussain would return to directing all his films again and would only relinquish the director's chair to his son after three of his films flopped in the 1980s. Salim Khan played a small role as Shammi Kapoor's musician friend who pretends to be Rocky in the musical number "Oh Haseena Zulfon Waali". In real life, Helen would later become his second wife. Shammi's wife Geeta Bali died during the filming, and Vijay helped Shammi get over the grief.

Dvd /VCD missing 21 minutes
The Dvd and Vcd versions of the film are missing 21 minutes of the film . The 1987 VCR release has the complete movie. The missing portion can be seen on Youtube at https://www.youtube.com/watch?v=cgntrX8Z_9A&ab_channel=AtulShah

References

External links
 

1966 films
1960s Hindi-language films
Films scored by R. D. Burman
Films directed by Vijay Anand